Euonymus lanceifolia is a species of plant in the family Celastraceae. It is endemic to China.

References

lanceifolia
Endemic flora of China
Vulnerable plants
Taxonomy articles created by Polbot